Armaside is an agricultural village in Cumbria, England, situated north of Low Lorton, south west of the River Cocker, and south east from Cockermouth - .

The village consists of Armaside, Armaside Farm, Armaside Howe, and High Armaside.  There is a local business dealing with wind turbines and other forms of renewable energy.

External links
DEFRA Conservation Walks, River Cocker, Lorton Vale

See also

List of places in Cumbria

Hamlets in Cumbria
Allerdale